Vidavaluru is a village and a mandal headquarters in Nellore district in the state of Andhra Pradesh in india. It is located in Kovur.

History
Vidavaluru is a village panchayat located in the Nellore district of Andhra Pradesh. Its latitude is 14.5721409 and its longitude is 80.0661975.

Politics

Vidavalur is represented by Kovur for the Andhra Pradesh Legislative Assembly. Nallapareddy Prasanna Kumar Reddy is the current MLA of Kovur (Assembly constituency) representing the YSR Congress Party.

References 

Villages in Nellore district